Groundhog Day is a musical with music and lyrics by Tim Minchin and a book by Danny Rubin. It is based on the 1993 film of the same name, which featured a screenplay co-written by Rubin.

It tells the story of Phil Connors, an arrogant Pittsburgh TV weatherman who, during an assignment covering the annual Groundhog Day event in Punxsutawney, Pennsylvania, finds himself in a time loop, repeating the same day again and again.

The musical made its world premiere at The Old Vic in London in summer 2016 and was nominated for eight Laurence Olivier Awards in 2017, winning for Best New Musical and Best Actor in a Leading Role in a Musical for Andy Karl; it later opened on Broadway in 2017, and was nominated for seven Tony Awards, including Best Musical and Best Actor in a Leading Role in Musical for Karl.

Background
The musical is based on the 1993 film Groundhog Day. The film itself starred Bill Murray as Phil Connors and Andie MacDowell as Rita Hanson and was produced on a budget of $14.6 million, earning over $70 million in domestic box office receipts. In 2006 it was added to the United States National Film Registry as being deemed "culturally, historically, or aesthetically significant." It was voted at number 8 in the top ten greatest films in the fantasy genre by the American Film Institute in 2006.

In August 2003, Stephen Sondheim, when asked what his next project might be, said that he was interested in the idea of a musical adaption of Groundhog Day. However, in a 2008 live chat, he said that "to make a musical of Groundhog Day would be to gild the lily. It cannot be improved." In 2009, during an interview with MTV News, Harold Ramis revealed that Danny Rubin was working on the book for a musical version of the film. Rubin affirmed he had been working on a concept of a Groundhog Day musical for some time, and already had about 12 song ideas (whittled down from 30) along with dialog, scenes, and other production aspects. Around 2012, Rubin had become stuck and felt it impossible he could make the musical happen as he believed he could not progress without the collaboration of a composer. Shortly after reaching this conclusion, Rubin was called by director Matthew Warchus to introduce him to Tim Minchin, who had just finished writing the songs for Matilda the Musical. Rubin felt Minchin's work in Matilda proved he "can write songs that are funny and moving and smart and beautiful," and the three started working on adapting Rubin's book.

The trio formally announced their partnership towards the musical in January 2014. A workshop was held in London on 12 July, and Minchin performed an early version of a song from the show; "Seeing You", during his concerts at KOKO (December 2013 along with "Night Will Come"), Hyde Park (July 2014), the steps at Sydney Opera House (February 2015).

On 2 April 2015, the musical was officially confirmed and it was announced that the show would receive its Broadway premiere in March 2017. It was later announced the musical would make its world premiere during 2016 at The Old Vic theatre in London, as part of director Matthew Warchus' debut season as artistic director of the theatre.

The musical has a book by Danny Rubin, based on his original story, and the screenplay co-written with Harold Ramis, and is directed by Matthew Warchus, with choreography by Peter Darling and Ellen Kane and design by Rob Howell. The show features an original score and lyrics by Australian comedian and lyricist Tim Minchin. The production reunites most of the creative team behind the 2010 musical Matilda.

Speaking about the musical, director Warchus said that it's "a show full of intellect, integrity and wit, insight, humor—and of course romance." Minchin, who wrote the music and lyrics for the adaptation, added, "Our version of Groundhog Day is going to be both instantly recognisable, and utterly different" and that "The central conceit is perfectly suited to the theatre... it has the potential to be complex, dark, visually fascinating, and thematically rich, whilst still being a joyous romantic comedy with cool tunes and lots of gags."

Productions

World premiere: London (2016)
The show's premiere production was scheduled to begin previews at The Old Vic in London, on 11 July 2016, with its official opening night coming on 16 August, booking for a limited period until 17 September 2016, with an extra performance added on 19 September 2016.

Tickets went on general sale on 12 April 2016, with priority booking from 10 March. In January 2016, it was announced that Andy Karl would play the lead role of Phil. Other notable casting for the show includes Carlyss Peer as Rita and Eugene McCoy as Larry.

On 8 June 2016, Minchin performed the musical's finale number, "Seeing You", with cast members Jack Shalloo, Carolyn Maitland, Georgina Hagen and Kieran Jae as backup singers at The South Bank Sky Arts Awards at the Savoy Hotel in London. Minchin also performed the song solo with the BBC Concert Orchestra at the BBC Proms in the Park in Hyde Park on 11 September 2016.

Initial previews were cancelled due to the technical complexities of the show, with the intention to restart on 15 July. The first preview became an open final dress rehearsal due to a technical issue with previews beginning instead on 16 July. The running time for the London production at The Old Vic was 2 hours and 25 minutes (including an interval of 20 minutes).

The production was nominated for 8 Laurence Olivier Awards. On 9 April 2017, it won the Olivier Awards for Best New Musical and Best Actor in a Musical for Andy Karl. At the ceremony, Minchin performed a song from the show, "Hope", with some of the London cast.

Broadway (2017) 
The musical had been scheduled to transfer to Broadway, opening on 9 March 2017, following previews from 23 January 2017. However, Playbill reported on 22 June 2016, that the musical "may not make it to Broadway in January 2017" because the lead producer, Scott Rudin, had withdrawn from the production. After the opening night of the production at The Old Vic in London, The New York Times revealed that the production was still intended to transfer to Broadway, produced by André Ptaszynski and Lia Vollack with Whistle Pig and Columbia Live Stage.

The musical premiered on Broadway at the August Wilson Theatre officially on 17 April 2017. On 19 October 2016, it was announced that Karl would reprise his role from the London production as Phil Connors with tickets going on sale from 2 November 2016. Previews would begin 16 March 2017. The full cast was announced in December 2016, which included Barrett Doss as Rita. The first scheduled preview on 16 March 2017, had to be stopped after approximately 15 minutes due to technical difficulties with the revolving stage. The performance continued as a concert for the rest of act one, with a sing-through of 6 songs after intermission using no technical components.

On the preview on the evening of 14 April, Karl injured himself onstage during the number "Philanthropy" tearing his anterior cruciate ligament, but he continued the performance with a cane. The matinee on 15 April was cancelled to allow his understudy Andrew Call (who usually played Gus) to rehearse for the evening performance. Despite his injury, Karl returned for the production's opening night on 17 April, receiving high praise in the reviews. He performed four performances in the week commencing 17 April to recover from his injury.

On 21 April, Andie MacDowell saw the show, and on 8 August, Bill Murray attended a performance with his brother Brian Doyle-Murray, who played Buster Green in the film. Bill Murray returned to watch the performance the following night.

The Broadway production closed on 17 September 2017, after 176 performances and 32 previews. An 18-month national tour beginning in 2018 had been planned. On 8 January 2018, Tim Minchin posted to his Twitter account that "Sadly (despicably) there’ll be no US tour".

London revival (2023) 
On 6 December 2022, it was announced that the musical will return to The Old Vic in London with Karl reprising the role of Phill Connors. Previews are due to begin 20 May, with a press night on 8 June running for a limited run until 12 August 2023.

US regional productions
In May 2018, Music Theatre International announced that it had acquired the rights to the musical, allowing the company to provide production licenses to regional theaters worldwide.

The first professional non-replica regional production was performed at San Francisco Playhouse in November 2019, directed by Susi Damilano, with Ryan Drummond in the role of Phil. The production ran from 20 November 2019 to 18 January 2020.

The musical was produced by Slow Burn Theatre Company Co in Fort Lauderdale, Florida from 31 January to 16 February 2020.

International productions 
A non-replica Swedish production presented by Wermland Opera in Karlstad opened 27 February running until 17 May 2020 (however due to the coronavirus pandemic, performances were cancelled from 16 March to 21 April).

A new Finnish production will open at the Helsinki City Theatre from 25 August until 31 December 2020.

Synopsis

Act I 
Phil Connors, an arrogant TV weatherman, is dreading his trip to Punxsutawney, PA to report on the annual Groundhog Day Ceremony, believing it is beneath him. As his weather van arrives in town, the people of Punxsutawney are hoping that the groundhog, Punxsutawney Phil, will not see his shadow, signifying an end to winter and the start of spring ("There Will Be Sun"). The next morning, Phil wakes on 2 February full of scorn for everything and everyone he encounters on his way to Gobbler's Knob where the annual ceremony takes place ("Day One pt. 1/ Small Town, U.S.A."). When he arrives on location he meets up with cameraman Larry and his new producer Rita before the groundhog's forecast of six more weeks of winter ("Day One pt. 2/ Punxsutawney Phil"). While Phil and Rita eat lunch at a diner, Larry packs the van preparing for their departure, and the sheriff enters and tells them that a bad snowstorm has closed every road out of town, keeping them from leaving. Rita makes an entry in her journal before the Groundhog Day banquet and the townspeople remain ever hopeful for the coming spring ("Day One pt. 3/ February 2nd/There Will Be Sun"). The next morning, Phil wakes on 2 February and confusedly relives his morning over again, including a run-in with obnoxious high school classmate Ned Ryerson ("Day Two pt. 1/ Small Town, U.S.A."). Phil begrudgingly reports on the ceremony with the same result as the day before ("Day Two pt. 2/ Punxsutawney Phil"), and Rita enjoys the festivities after commenting in her journal about Phil's odd behavior ("Day Two pt. 3/ February 2nd/There Will Be Sun"). The next morning, Phil wakes on 2 February and fearing a mental breakdown ("Day Three"), consults every doctor and healer in town, none of whom is medically qualified, and who all suggest a variety of unusual remedies ("Stuck"). Phil decides to self-medicate at the bar instead, and finds camaraderie with two drunks who are stuck in a rut and live feel that life is repetitive. The trio takes advantage of not having a future and drive recklessly on train tracks and evade the police before they are caught and Phil is arrested ("Nobody Cares"). The next morning, Phil wakes on 2 February with a newfound skip in his step as he openly treats others terribly, does as he pleases, and uses his repeated days to meet and reintroduce himself to Nancy Taylor, a local woman that he tricks into sleeping with him ("Philandering"). After settling into a hedonistic groove, Phil sets his sights on Rita, determined to sleep with her. He spends several days trying to manufacture her perfect date, and grows more manic as he invariably keeps failing. With success never in sight, Phil wonders why he couldn't repeat a better day, Rita wonders if she'll ever find someone she could love, and the townspeople wonder if they will ever do all the things they've been putting off, waiting for an idealized future ("One Day"). The next morning, Phil wakes on 2 February and smashes his alarm clock.

Act II 
Act Two opens at yet another Groundhog Day Ceremony as Nancy Taylor contemplates her behaviour patterns and how she presents herself ("Playing Nancy"). Phil arrives at Gobbler's Knob for his broadcast and interrupts his report to shoot Punxsutawney Phil and then himself. The next morning, Phil wakes on 2 February and exhausts every way to kill himself, vowing not to give up ("Hope") that he will one day successfully commit suicide. Phil returns to the diner and with nothing to lose, tells Rita what is happening, proving his claims by spouting off facts about the townspeople, predicting their actions, and finally telling Rita things he has learned about her ("Everything About You"). Intrigued, Rita spends the day with Phil, learning various things he's done about town and theorizing what she would do in his shoes ("If I Had My Time Again"). That evening Rita goes to the B&B to see what happens when his day starts over, but falls asleep first, with Phil ("Everything About You (Reprise)”).

The next morning, Phil wakes on 2 February alone again and decides to engage with the townspeople and better himself, even learning to play the piano ("Philosopher"). Phil learns that Ned's wife has died, and later that evening, he finds a homeless man dead in the park, which he spends several days trying to prevent before accepting that some things are inevitable ("Night Will Come"). On a new Groundhog Day, Phil delivers a surprisingly profound broadcast before running about town all day helping townspeople ("Philanthropy"). Rita arrives at the banquet and overhears everyone in town raving about what Phil has done for them that day, only to discover he is also playing in the band ("Punxsutawney Rock"). In a bachelor auction, Rita buys a dance with Phil and kisses him, both feeling that they are only just learning what the other is like ("Seeing You"). The next morning, Phil wakes to find Rita still in his room and a fresh layer of snow covering the ground outside. Though overjoyed at finally being able to leave, Phil agrees to spend the day with Rita. They start their day with watching the sun rise in Punxsutawney on February 3 ("Dawn").

Musical numbers  

 Act I
 "There Will Be Sun" – Company
 "Small Town, U.S.A." (Day 1) – Phil and Company
 "Punxsutawney Phil" – Company
 "February 2nd" / "There Will Be Sun" – Rita and Company
 "Small Town, U.S.A." (Day 2) – Phil and Company
 "Punxsutawney Phil" – Company
 "February 2nd" / "There Will Be Sun" – Rita and Company
 "Small Town, U.S.A." (Day 3) – Phil and Company
 "Stuck" – Phil and Healers
 "Nobody Cares" – Gus, Ralph, Phil and Company
 "Philandering" – Company
 "One Day" – Rita, Phil and Company

 Act II
 "Playing Nancy" – Nancy
 "Hope" – Phil and Company
 "Everything About You" – Phil
 "If I Had My Time Again" – Rita, Phil and Company
 "Everything About You" (Reprise) – Phil
 "Philosopher" – Phil and Company
 "Night Will Come" – Ned
 "Philanthropy" – Phil and Company
 "Punxsutawney Rock" – Piano Teacher and Company
 "Seeing You" – Phil, Rita and Company
 "Dawn" – Company

Orchestration

Original Broadway cast recording
The original Broadway cast album was recorded in March 2017 and was released digitally on 21 April and in stores 5 May 2017. The album is available from Broadway / Masterworks and is produced by Chris Nightingale, Michael Croiter and Tim Minchin. The songs "Hope", "If I Had My Time Again" and "Seeing You" were released prematurely to download for iTunes, Amazon.com and Spotify.

Characters and original cast 
The characters and original cast:

The dance captain and assistant dance captain for the Old Vic production were Leanne Pinder and Damien Poole, respectively. For the Broadway production, Camden Gonzales was the dance captain while Michael Fatica was the assistant dance captain.

Critical reception 
The original London production was received positively, opening to a string of five-star reviews.

The Broadway production also received mostly positive reviews, particularly praising Andy Karl for returning to the production despite his earlier injury.

Awards and nominations

Original London production

Original Broadway production

Notes
1.Michael Motroni and Danielle Philapil shared the role of the Storm Chaser as part of the regional San Francisco production.
2.Matthew Malthouse covered the role of the Hot Dog Vendor as part of his Swing track in the London production. The role has been renamed for the Broadway production, but according to cast members' social media, Kevin Bernard is still considered part of the Swing team for the production.

References

External links

2016 musicals
Musicals based on films
Broadway musicals
Laurence Olivier Award-winning musicals
Existentialist plays
Plays set in Pennsylvania